Mark West Union School District (MWUSD) is a public school district formed in 1868 in the Mark West/Larkfield area of Santa Rosa in Sonoma County, California. The school district is named for the area it serves, which is named for William Marcus West.

Schools and programs 
 Mark West Elementary School (K–6), opened in 1868 and serving more than 400 students in 2010–11.
 John B. Riebli Elementary School (K–6), opened in August 1992 and serving more than 500 students in 2010–11.
 San Miguel Elementary School (K–6), serving more than 375 students.
 Mark West Charter School (7–8), a charter school serving more than 150 students.

In addition, MWUSD offers a home study program for students in grades 7 and 8.

References

External links
 

School districts established in 1868
School districts in Sonoma County, California
1868 establishments in California